Juhapura ([dʒuɦɑpuɾɑ]) is a neighbourhood in New West Zone of Ahmedabad, Gujarat, India near Sarkhej, along the National Highway 8A that goes towards Saurashtra and Kutch. The area was developed in 1973 for the people who lost houses in flood, it was founded then prime minister of India Mrs. Indira Gandhi. The first housing society of the area was Sarni Kamdar.

The population of Juhapura is largely Muslim. Many Muslim professionals and businessmen also live in this area.

Juhapura was a small suburb with a small population until the mid-1980s, but after the communal riots of Gujarat from 1985 until 2002, many Muslims migrated from the Muslim and Hindu-dominated areas of Ahmedabad and the surrounding cities to Juhapura, causing a construction boom. Land and housing prices subsequently increased.

Juhapura is primarily residential but now also hosts a hospital, many schools, restaurants and dhabas and a food market. 5 lakh is population

External links
 Juhapura's Official website for its community
 Juhapura strives for self-sufficiency

References 

Neighbourhoods in Ahmedabad